Nipekamew may refer to any of the following:

Nipekamew Lake, a lake in Saskatchewan, Canada
Nipekamew River, a river in Saskatchewan
Nipekamew Creek, a creek in Saskatchewan
Nipekamew Bay, a bay on Lac la Ronge in Saskatchewan
Nipekamew Sand Cliffs, a landform in Saskatchewan
East Trout-Nipekamew Lakes Recreation Site, a park in Saskatchewan